Patanga is a genus of grasshoppers in the subfamily Cyrtacanthacridinae.  Species are distributed throughout Asia: from India, China, Japan, Indochina and western Malesia. The genus was named by Boris Uvarov in 1923, with the type species the economically significant Bombay locust:  which has also been placed in genus Nomadacris.

Species 
, the Orthoptera Species File lists:
Patanga apicerca Huang, 1982 - China
Patanga avis Rehn & Rehn, 1941 - Philippines
Patanga humilis Bi, 1986 - Tibet
Patanga japonica (Bolívar, 1898) - India, Vietnam, Korea, Japan (poss. incomplete)
Patanga luteicornis (Serville, 1838) - Java
Patanga succincta (Johannson, 1763) - India, SE Asia, Japan

References

External links

Cyrtacanthacridinae
Acrididae genera
Orthoptera of Asia
Taxa named by Boris Uvarov